Jurassic Forest is a seasonal tourist attraction located on Highway 28 just north of Gibbons, Alberta, just minutes away from Edmonton, Alberta by vehicle. The facility is situated in a mature mixed Aspen parkland forest setting and features more than 40 animatronic dinosaurs in their natural habitat. The dinosaurs can be easily viewed from wooden trails that lead through the forest. The trails are wheelchair friendly and are accessible in all types of weather conditions.

History
Jurassic Forest is an educational and entertainment centre that opened on July 30, 2010. When it opened, the facility featured a total of 42 animatronic dinosaurs, an interpretive centre, concession and gift shop area. In 2011, several facility enhancements were undertaken including the development of an upgraded concession area, enhanced playground area and the addition of three interactive educational displays inside the interpretive centre. A new dinosaur was also added to the North Discovery trail, as the Spinosaurus became the 43rd dinosaur to be featured at Jurassic Forest.

In 2012, the addition of three new Pachyrhinosaurus, and a Troodon highlighted the opening of the new season.

In 2013, the expansion of the discovery trails continued with the North and South trail extensions. "From Scales to Fur" is the theme of the south extension. Taking Flight" is the theme of the north extension. Both trail extensions feature creatures that are not consistent with the dinosaur-only displays of the previous three years. With these new animals, the total number of displays is now 51 animals.

Dinosaurs

Albertosaurus
Ankylosaurus
Apatosaurus
Coelophysis
Corythosaurus
Dimetrodon
Edmontosaurus
Gastornis
Hadrosaurus
Iguanodon
Maiasaura
Ornitholestes
Pachycephalosaurus
Parasaurolophus
Pteranodon
Spinosaurus
Stegosaurus
Styracosaurus
Triceratops
Tyrannosaurus
Utahraptor
Troodon

Gallery

External links
 Jurassic Forest

Tourist attractions in Alberta
Buildings and structures completed in 2010
Animatronic attractions
2010 establishments in Alberta
Tourist attractions in Edmonton